Gaurotinus is a genus of beetles in the family Cerambycidae, and the only species in the genus is Gaurotinus tenuelineatus. It was described by Fairmaire in 1897.

References

Dorcasominae
Monotypic Cerambycidae genera